The 2000–01 Liga Alef season saw Hapoel Ironi Kiryat Shmona (champions of the North Division) and Maccabi Yavne (champions of the South Division) winning the title and promotion to Liga Artzit.

At the bottom, Maccabi Isfiya, Hapoel Iksal (from North division), Hapoel Ihud Tzeirei Jaffa and Sektzia Nes Tziona (from South division) were all automatically relegated to Liga Bet.

North Division

South Division

References
Liga Alef North, 00-01 One 
Liga Alef South, 00-01 One 

Liga Alef seasons
4
Israel